Miss Beryll is a 1921 German silent film directed by Frederic Zelnik and starring Lya Mara, Erich Kaiser-Titz, and Fritz Schulz. The film's sets were designed by the art director Fritz Lederer. It premiered at the Marmorhaus in Berlin.

Cast

References

Bibliography

External links

1921 films
Films of the Weimar Republic
Films directed by Frederic Zelnik
German silent feature films
German black-and-white films